Homalopoma indutum, common name the two-faced dwarf turban, is a species of small sea snail with calcareous opercula, a marine gastropod mollusk in the family Colloniidae.

Description
The white-glossy shell grows to a height of 6.9 mm. The small shell has a conoidal shape. The whorls are tumid. The base is flattened. The whole surface is faintly marked with remote spiral threads, and very faintly scratched with closer microscopic striae. The whorls are bluntly angulated in the middle, and the last is so, besides, at the base below the periphery. This angulation meets the outer lip. The second and third whorls have two or three strong spiral threads. There are very many close unequal oblique lines of growth. Of these, the strongest rise in close-set infra-sutural puckerings, which on the third whorl resemble small beads. There is a glossy, thin ivory-white calcareous coat over a brilliant pearly white layer. The  spire is high and fine-pointed. The apex is blunt, the smooth rounded 1½ whorl is scarcely
projecting. There are six tumid whorls increasing rapidly.  The penultimate whorl rises swollen out of the suture. The base of the shell is a little flattened. The suture is linear, not impressed, a little coarse, slightly marginated by the overlap of the succeeding on the preceding whorl and the slight tumidity caused by the infra-sutural puckerings. The round aperture is very oblique, with a soft pearly nacre all round. The outer lip is very slightly descending, thick, and bevelled outwards to a sharp edge.  There is a broad thin hyaline pad spread over the body that connects the outer lip and the columella, which is broad, thick, shallowly excavated, with a slight external median horizontal tooth or ridge. The edge is reverted and closely appressed. The thin, calcareous operculum is small. It is flat, convex on the inside, where it shows 7½ whorls.  The body whorl begins suddenly to enlarge close to its end.

Distribution
This species occurs in the Atlantic Ocean off North Carolina, USA;, and Puerto Rico.

References

 Dall, W. H. 1889. Reports on the results of dredgings, under the supervision of Alexander Agassiz, in the Gulf of Mexico (1877-78) and in the Caribbean Sea (1879-80), by the U. S. Coast Survey Steamer 'Blake,'. Bulletin of the Museum of Comparative Zoology 18: 1-492, pls. 10-40.
 Turgeon, D.; Quinn, J.F.; Bogan, A.E.; Coan, E.V.; Hochberg, F.G.; Lyons, W.G.; Mikkelsen, P.M.; Neves, R.J.; Roper, C.F.E.; Rosenberg, G.; Roth, B.; Scheltema, A.; Thompson, F.G.; Vecchione, M.; Williams, J.D. (1998). Common and scientific names of aquatic invertebrates from the United States and Canada: mollusks. 2nd ed. American Fisheries Society Special Publication, 26. American Fisheries Society: Bethesda, MD (USA). . IX, 526 + cd-rom pp. (look up in IMIS)
page(s): 59

External links
 To Biodiversity Heritage Library (1 publication)
 To Encyclopedia of Life
 To ITIS
 To World Register of Marine Species

Colloniidae
Gastropods described in 1879